Cynthia Tima Yeboah, popularly known as Tima Kumkum, is a Ghanaian television and radio presenter, actress, media practitioner and voice-over artist. She is best known widely as the host of Kumkum Bhagya on Adom TV in Ghana. She was nominated as the TV Female Entertainment Show Host of the Year at the 2019 RTP Awards. Her Aben Show was also nominated as the TV Cooking/Culinary Program of the Year at the 2021 RTP Awards.

Early life and education 
Tima was born on Thursday 17 September in Obuasi to Mary Andzi Quainoo and Felix Kwaah Yeboah.

She received her high school education from Ghana National College, where she studied general arts, and continued to the Institute of Business Management & Journalism, where she graduated with a diploma in journalism before topping up with a bachelor's degree in journalism at Jayee University College. She is currently reading her masters in PR at Ghana Institute of Journalism.

Career 
She is the host of Aben Show which was aired on AdomTV but now Angel TV.

Tima was honored together with Akumaa Mama Zimbi and Andy Dosty for their influence and impact in Ghana's Showbiz industry at the 2022 Ghana Tertiary Awards.

Awards 

 African Tertiary Entrepreneurs Awards (Showbiz Star Foundation of the Year 2018)
 Ghana Outstanding Women Awards (Outstanding Woman Young TV Host 2018)
 Pan African Executives Summit Awards (Multi-Talented Media Personality of the Year 2018)
 Young Professional Role Model Awards (Young Professional Role Model Award in Media Excellence 2020)
 Young Choice Awards 2021 (Youth Favorite TV Personality of the Year 2020)
 Ghana Outstanding Women Awards 2021(Outstanding Woman Radio Personality)

Ambassador 
Tima is an ambassador for Slim and Fit GH. She was made Pan African Youth Empowerment Ambassador from 2018 to 2022 for Pan African Executives Summit Awards. She is the brand ambassador for Top Choco, a Ghanaian chocololate spread and drinks company. Tima was also unveiled as a brand ambassador for Altunsa tomato paste on July 9, 2022.

Filmography 

 Asem Asa (2007)
 Aden (2009)
 Madam Moke (2009)
 Mmobrowa (2009)
 Asabea (2009)
 Obra(2009)
 89 (2010)
 Supremo (2010)
 Sugar (2010)
 Whose Fault(2011)
 Asantewaa (2019)
 Baby is coming(2020)
 Cross(2021)

Philanthropy 
As a philanthropist, Tima founded the Tima Kumkum Foundation where they occasionally make donations including Osu Correction Centre, teenage mothers in Teshie-Nungua, Royal Seed Orphanage, 21-year old fibroid patient, 13-year old rape victim, and others.

Personal life 
Tima Kumkum is divorced after five years of marriage with two children.

References

External links 

 
 

Living people
1987 births